is a role-playing video game (RPG) developed by Yumekobo for the Neo Geo Pocket Color. Released in Japan and North America in 1999 by publisher SNK, Biomotor Unitron was the first RPG for the SNK handheld console. A Nintendo Switch version was released on May 26, 2022.

A sequel, Kikou Seiki Unitron, was released in Japan in 2000, but because of SNK's bankruptcy the title never saw a release in the United States.

Gameplay
Biomotor Unitron is a "dungeon crawler" RPG with pseudorandom dungeons. The player controls a robot called a Unitron, and walks through the dungeons fighting battles to earn money and experience. The experience boosts stats for the player character, and their "control" of the Unitron, but not the Unitron itself. There is rather a system of parts upgrades. The upgraded parts can be purchased, or "developed" using existing items, "tools", and "materials". The game has a fairly standard HP system. Instead of MP, there is EP, and EP is consumed with every action in battle. EP regenerates with every battle. In the game, there are initially four dungeons and a town. Each of the four dungeons that are initially available, has elemental affinity, and seven floors. Each dungeon's layout, rather than being truly random, is selected from multiple preprogrammed layouts. The town is menu-driven, with access to "Works", where you equip parts, develop parts, and save data. There is also a shop, and there are multiple areas you can visit to talk to the townspeople. Some of the townspeople provide stat boosts, or will sell items to you. Finally, there is an arena in town, where you can fight other Unitrons for money, prizes, and many levels of advancing rank. The game has two main goals. The first goal is to build your Unitron up as much as possible. The second, is to clear the first four elemental affinity dungeons, and then clear the final dungeon, finishing the game.

Reception 

Biomotor Unitron received positive reception from critics since its release.

In 2014, HobbyConsolass Álvaro Alonso identified Biomotor Unitron as one of the twenty best games for the Neo Geo Pocket Color. Likewise, Time Extension listed it as one of the best games for the NGPC.

Notes

References

External links 

 Biomotor Unitron at GameFAQs
 Biomotor Unitron at Giant Bomb
 Biomotor Unitron at MobyGames

1999 video games
Aicom games
Neo Geo Pocket Color games
Role-playing video games
SNK games
Video games developed in Japan